Breiz may refer to

Places
Brittany, the English name for the French region called Breiz in the Breton language

Publications
Breiz Atao (Brittany for Ever), a Breton nationalist journal of the mid-twentieth century
Breiz da Zont (Brittany of the Future), a Breton nationalist periodical of the 1930s 
Barzaz Breiz (Ballads of Brittany), a book of Breton songs collected by Théodore Hersart de la Villemarqué and published in 1839
Feiz ha Breiz (Faith and Brittany), a leading weekly newspaper in the Breton language